Dennis Matthews may refer to:

Sports
 Denny Matthews (born 1942), American sportscaster
 Dennis Matthews (cricketer) (born 1943), New Zealand cricketer
Dennis Matthews (footballer) (born 1952), Australian rules footballer

Others
Dennis Matthews (politician), see Gibraltar National Day
 Denis Matthews (1919–1988), British concert pianist